Todd McCarthy (Born December 9, 1962) is a Canadian lawyer and politician, who was elected to the Legislative Assembly of Ontario in the 2022 provincial election. He represents the riding of Durham as a Member of the Progressive Conservative Party of Ontario.  McCarthy was also named Parliamentary Assistant to the President of the Treasury Board Prabmeet Sarkaria. In addition to his Parliamentary Assistant Role, he was appointed, Deputy Government Whip and is a Member of the Standing Committee on Public Accounts.

Education 
McCarthy attended Holy Spirit Catholic School from 1967-1976 and went on to Senator O'Connor College School graduating in 1981. He majored in Political Science at the University of Toronto St. Michael's College earning a Bachelor of Arts degree with Distinction in 1984. He studied Law at Osgoode Hall Law School, York University earning a Bachelor of Laws in 1987. After articling and completing the 30th Bar Admission Course, McCarthy was called to the Bar of Ontario in 1989. He went on to practice law as a Barrister & Solicitor and was a leading trial lawyer throughout the Province of Ontario for 33 years before being elected to Provincial Parliament in June 2022. He was one of the youngest certified Specialists in Civil Litigation when recognized as such in 1996 by the Law Society of Upper Canada as it then was.

Career 
McCarthy joined the law firm of what is now Flaherty McCarthy LLP in 1994. The firm was founded that same year by the Late Honourable Jim Flaherty, former Deputy Premier, Christine Elliott and Mr. Justice Grant Dow. In addition to a successful career as a trial and appellate lawyer, McCarthy served as a School Board Trustee from 1993-1997 with the Durham Region Separate School Board. He was elected in 1994 winning by just 3 votes and serving as Vice-chair in 1996-1997. From 2002-2011, McCarthy served as a Deputy Judge of the Small Claims Court in Durham Region. He was a PC Party of Ontario candidate for Provincial Parliament in 2011 and 2014. He was also a Conservative Party of Canada candidate for Federal Parliament in 2019. In 2015-2016, McCarthy served as a Director at the Canada Revenue Agency. He was also an adjunct professor at Durham College in 2010 and at the Faculty of Law Queen's University from 2011-2019. In 2021, he appeared before the House of Commons Justice Committee to address delays in the Justice system and proposed solutions. He is a fearless defender of the Right to Trial by Jury in civil cases. McCarthy has written and spoken out extensively both on this subject in 2020 and 2021 [4] and on Canada's unique Constitutional provisions

Awards 
McCarthy has been recognized as a leading Ontario Lawyer. In 2019, he was recognized as the Defence Honouree of the Year by the Ontario Trial Lawyers Association. In 2021, he received an Insurance Law Award of Excellence from the Ontario Bar Association. His contributions to the Administrations of Justice include many articles, lectures and seminars in relations to continuing legal education. McCarthy appeared as Trial Counsel in over 100 jury and non-jury trials throughout Ontario and in numerous appeals before the Ontario Court of Appeal and the

Divisional Court. Many of these appearances resulted in numerous precedent setting decisions which have contributed to the development of a significant body of published Case Law.

Political Career 
McCarthy was nominated to be the Progressive Conservative Party of Ontario candidate for Durham on December 16, 2021. He then went on to win a seat in the 2022 Ontario General Election on June 2, 2022 winning by over 10,000 votes. He has since been appointed a Parliamentary Assistant to the President of the Treasury Board, Deputy Government Whip and as a Member of the Standing Committee on Public Accounts. On August 10, 2022, McCarthy was the first Member of Ontario's 43rd Parliament to address the House in Reply to the Speech from the Throne. His Maiden Speech was very well received by those MPPs, visitors and observers who were present in the House and by those who were able to observe on television and social media. In addition to his duties at Queen's Park, McCarthy is active and engaged in his constituency as the Member of Provincial Parliament for Durham.

Personal Life 
McCarthy was born in Scarborough, Ontario to Irish Catholic parents Mary and John McCarthy. He is one of their three sons. His brother John McCarthy is a Judge of the Ontario Superior Court of Justice and his brother Gerry is a member of the Social Security Tribunal of Canada. McCarthy married Kathy Azzopardi on July 25, 1987 at St. Bonaventure Catholic Church. They purchased their first home in Durham Region in 1989. The McCarthys continue to live in Durham Region. Kathy McCarthy recently retired as a psychometrist after 33 years with the Durham Catholic District School Board. The couple have three adult children. Meaghan McCarthy (born in 1992) is a Lawyer. Brendan McCarthy (born in 1995) is a Story Editor at TSN. Jake McCarthy (born in 1998) is a special needs young adult who survived osteosarcoma and is on the autism spectrum. Jake is the pride and joy of the family. The McCarthys have participated in many charitable and philanthropic endeavours within Durham Region and throughout the Greater Toronto Area. They are particularly proud of their extended family of In-laws, cousins, nieces and nephews and many friends and acquaintances who are much like extended family. McCarthy was active in sports theatre and student politics in High School and University. He went on to coach and sponsor minor hockey and sports teams in Durham Region. He has spent every summer at Thunder Beach, Ontario, since 1963, initially at a cottage purchased in 1924 by his great-grandparents and most recently at the family cottage close by.

Electoral record

References 

Living people
Progressive Conservative Party of Ontario MPPs
21st-century Canadian politicians
People from Clarington
Year of birth missing (living people)